Mazlum Çimen (born 18 June 1958 in Elbistan, Kahramanmaraş) is a Turkish musician, ballet dancer, film actor, folk singer, and award-winning film score composer.

Early life
He was born in Sevdilli village of Elbistan in Kahramanmaraş Province on 18 June 1958. He is the son of Nesimi Çimen who is a great Ashik, songwriter and Cura Virtuoso in history. His parents originate however from Hozat in Tunceli Province.

His family moved to Istanbul as he was still in pre-school age. After Mazlum finished his primary school education, he attended Istanbul State Conservatory to study violin. Four years later, he switched over to ballet dancing section of the same music school and graduated in 1981. He entered Istanbul State Opera and Ballet as a ballet dancer, where he is still employed.

Music career
Mazlum toured across the country with his father Nesimi Çimen, a well-known folk music singer, and was so introduced in music composing. He created his first compositions already in 1980. With his music teacher İhsan Yüce's initiation, he stepped into the film music field, where he found the strong support of Onat Kutlar, a poet and co-founder of the Istanbul International Film Festival.

His first commercial compositions were for the film Mem û Zin in 1991 and for the TV mini-series Aysarı'nın Zilleri in 1992. He was awarded three times the Golden Orange and twice the Golden Boll for best film score. In 2008, he received the Best Film Score Award for Nokta at the Montpellier Mediterranean Film Festival in France.

Beside composing film and TV mini-series score in addition to his primary profession as ballet dancer, Mazlum Çimen plays in movies, sings and records folk music.

Filmography

Film score
68'den 6 Mayıs'a
Nazım Hikmet Belgeseli
Mem û Zin (1991)
Gelincik Tarlası (1993)
Soğuk Geceler (1994) aka Kalte Nächte
Hollywood Kaçakları (1996)
Işıklar Sönmesin (1996)
Büyük Adam Küçük Aşk (2002) aka Hejar or Big Man, Little Love or Megali exousia, mikri agapi
Gönlümdeki Köşk Olmasa (2002) aka Omfavn mig måne or House of Hearts 
Martılar Açken (2002)
Oyun (2005)
Solgun Duvarlı Kent (2007)
Son Cellat (2008)
Nokta (2008) aka Dot
Umut (film) (2009)
Köy (2009) aka The Village

TV mini-series score 
Aysarı'nın Zilleri (1992)
Berivan (2002)
Gelin (2003) aka The Bride
Şıh Senem (2003)
Hacı (2006) aka Hadji
Kara Duvak (2007)
Hanımın Çiftliği (2009)
Şevkat Yerimdar

Theatre music
Yunus Emre (1989 Diyarbakır State Theatre)
Ferhat ile Şirin (İstanbul City Theatre)

Actor
Hababam Sınıfı Güle Güle (1981)
Hoşçakal Yarın (1998) or Goodbye Tomorrow - Yusuf Arslan
Gönlümdeki Köşk Olmasa (2002) - Ali
Anlat İstanbul (2004) - Şehmuz
Son Cellat (2008) - Ampul Adam
Yahşi Batı (2009) - Wanted Şerif I
Umut (2009) - İlyas
Söz Vermiştin (2019) - Mazlum

Albums 
Çimen Türküleri, Ada Müzik (1995)
Mem ü Zin, Kalan Müzik (1996)
Çimen Sesleri, Ada Müzik (2001)
Feryadı İsyanım, Ada Müzik (2002)
Buluşmalar, Kalan Müzik (2006)

References

External links
 Mazlum Çimen at Sinema Türk
 

1958 births
People from Elbistan
Turkish musicians
Turkish classical violinists
Turkish male ballet dancers
Turkish film score composers
Turkish folk singers
Living people
Best Music Score Golden Orange Award winners
Best Music Score Golden Boll Award winners
Turkish male film actors
21st-century classical violinists
Turkish people of Kurdish descent